The Golden Grand Prix Osaka is an international athletics competition in Osaka, Japan, held in May at the Yanmar Stadium Nagai, since 2018 under its current name. From 1996 to 2010 the event was known as the Osaka Grand Prix. Formerly part of the IAAF Grand Prix (2005–2009) and the IAAF World Challenge (2010), it was replaced in 2011 by the Golden Grand Prix Kawasaki, but the Golden Grand Prix returned to Osaka in 2018.

Meeting records

Men

Women

References

External links 
Official site
 Page of Osaka Grand Prix at the IAAF World Challenge website

Athletics competitions in Japan
M
Sports competitions in Osaka
IAAF World Challenge
IAAF Grand Prix
IAAF World Outdoor Meetings